Aspidura deraniyagalae, commonly known as Deraniyagala's rough-sided snake, the Sri Lanka rough-sided snake, and කදු  මැඩිල්ලා  (kandu medilla) in Sinhala, is a colubrid species endemic to Sri Lanka.

Etymology
The specific name, deraniyagalae, is in honor of Sri Lankan zoologist Paules Edward Pieris Deraniyagala.

Geographic range
A. deraniyagalae is known from the eastern slopes of the central highlands of Sri Lanka. Localities recorded are Namunukula, Kanawarella, Spring Valley, and Pindarawatta.

Habitat

Description
A. deraniyagalae is a small snake. The head is indistinct from the neck, and the body is cylindrical in cross section. The dorsum is light beige to dark brown. The head is dark-pigmented. The venter is blackish-brown, with lighter mottling.

Scalation
A. deraniyagalae has the following scalation. The dorsal scales are arranged in 17 rows at midbody. Preoculars are present, forming a part of the anterior border of the orbit of the eye. The 2 postoculars are in contact with the parietal. Ventrals 117–122. Subcaudals 13–26.

Reproduction
Sexually mature females of A. deraniyagalae produce about 2 to 4 eggs at a time.

References

External links
http://reptile-database.reptarium.cz/species?genus=Aspidura&species=deraniyagalae
http://www.wildreach.com/reptile/Serpentes/Aspidura%20deraniyagalae.php
http://slendemics.net/easl/reps/COLUBRIDAE.html

Further reading
Gans C, Fetcho JR (1982). "The Sri Lankan genus Aspidura (Serpentes, Reptilia, Colubridae)". Annals of Carnegie Museum 51 (14): 271–316. (Aspidura deraniyagalae, new species).

Aspidura
Reptiles described in 1982
Reptiles of Sri Lanka